Berhaneyesus Demerew Souraphiel, CM (born 14 July 1948) is an Ethiopian prelate of the Ethiopian Catholic Church, which he has headed since his election as Ethiopian Catholic Archbishop of Addis Abeba in 1999. He is also the chancellor of the Catholic University of Eastern Africa and the president of the Catholic Bishops’ Conference of Ethiopia and Eritrea. He was elevated to the rank of cardinal by Pope Francis in 2015.

He was imprisoned while a priest by the Communist government of Ethiopia in 1979–80. A member of the Congregation of the Mission, he directed the order's novitiate in the mid-1980s and was provincial superior from 1990 to 1994. He served as auxiliary bishop of Addis Abeda for 18 months before becoming archbishop.

Early life and priesthood
Berhaneyesus Demerew Souraphiel was born on 14 July 1948 in Tchela Claka, near Harar in Ethiopia. He first attended public schools and those run by the Ethiopian Orthodox Tewahedo Church, and then others run by the Capuchins and the De La Salle Brothers. He entered the minor seminary of the Congregation of the Mission (known as "Lazarists" or "Vincentians") in 1963. He studied at the Makanissa Major Seminary beginning in 1968. He studied theology at King's College London and was ordained a Catholic priest on 4 July 1976.

He fulfilled parish assignments in southwestern Ethiopia until, in June 1979, he was jailed by Ethiopia's military dictatorship for seven months, including one month in solitary confinement. When the government expelled foreign missionaries, he was left with responsibility for 15 parishes in addition to his original assignment. When sent into exile himself, he earned a degree in sociology at the Pontifical Gregorian University. He returned to Ethiopia in 1983.

Episcopate
In 1990 Berhaneyesus Souraphiel became provincial superior of the Lazarists in Addis Ababa. In 1994 he was appointed prefect of the newly created Apostolic Vicariate of Jimma-Bonga. On 7 November 1997, Pope John Paul II appointed him auxiliary bishop of Addis Abeba and he was consecrated a bishop on 25 January 1998 by Cardinal Paulos Tzadua. On 7 July 1999 he succeeded Paulos Tzadua as Ethiopian Catholic Archbishop of Addis Abeba.

In 2005, he established the Ethiopian Catholic University of St. Thomas Aquinas. He has served as its chancellor and toured the United States to raise funds through an organization founded by Archbishop Silvano Tomasi, a veteran Vatican diplomat.

In December 2008, he was one of a dozen Ethiopian religious figures who adopted a resolution that called homosexuality "an infestation", and urged Ethiopian lawmakers to extend the country's criminalization of homosexual activity to the constitution.

He was elected chairman of the Association of Member Episcopal Conferences in Eastern Africa (AMECEA) during its 18th Plenary Assembly in Malawi in July 2014.

Cardinal 
On 4 January 2015, Pope Francis announced that he would make him a cardinal on 14 February. At that ceremony, he was made a cardinal priest and was assigned the titular church of San Romano Martire.

On 13 April 2015, hé was appointed a member of the Congregation for the Oriental Churches and of the Pontifical Council for the Pastoral Care of Migrants and Itinerants.

In 2015, as part of a long campaign for national reconciliation following the end of the military council's authoritarian rule (1974–1987), he advocated for imprisoned Derg officials to have their death sentences commuted, and he met with several of them, including one who had arrested him years earlier, upon their release from prison. He has served as head of the Ethiopian Peace and Reconciliation Commission.

In advance of the Synod on the Amazon, he said he viewed the question of married priests as secondary to more critical issues: "the Amazon is the lung of the world — and it was burning — and what action was being taken? And the indigenous people who are living there, what right have they been given by the nine countries which surround the Amazon? Did they get educational opportunities? Health opportunities? Opportunities to preserve their traditional values?"

See also
Cardinals created by Pope Francis

References

External links

 

1948 births
Living people
Alumni of King's College London
Pontifical Gregorian University alumni
Ethiopian Eastern Catholics
Ethiopian cardinals
Cardinals created by Pope Francis
Ethiopian Catholic Archbishops of Addis Abeba
Members of the Congregation for the Oriental Churches
People from Harari Region